Carl Gustaf Kröningssvärd (19 January 1786 - 6 September 1859) was a Swedish lawyer and historian.

He was born on 19 January 1786 at Stavre in Västerfärnebo parish in Västerås to Major Abraham Zacharias Kröningssvärd and Elsa Magdalena Polhammar. He received his law degree in 1806 from Uppsala University and was appointed 1813 to the county clerk in Kopparberg. He died on 6 September 1859 in Sweden.

1786 births
1859 deaths
19th-century Swedish historians
19th-century Swedish lawyers